Stanley Beckwith (July 11, 1896 – October 2, 1984) was an American Negro league shortstop in the 1910s.

A native of Louisville, Kentucky, Beckwith was the older brother of fellow Negro leaguer John Beckwith. He played for the Jewell's ABCs club and for the Chicago Giants in 1917. In five recorded games, he posted three hits in 20 plate appearances. Beckwith died in Cleveland, Ohio in 1984 at age 88.

References

External links
Baseball statistics and player information from Baseball-Reference Black Baseball Stats and Seamheads

1896 births
1984 deaths
Chicago Giants players
Baseball shortstops
Baseball players from Louisville, Kentucky
20th-century African-American sportspeople